Chirag Parmar (born 25 December 1990) is an Indian cricketer. He made his Twenty20 debut for Gujarat in the 2016–17 Inter State Twenty-20 Tournament on 4 February 2017. He made his List A debut for Gujarat in the 2016–17 Vijay Hazare Trophy on 25 February 2017.

References

External links

1990 births
Living people
Indian cricketers
Gujarat cricketers
People from Rajkot